The LB&SCR I1 class was a class of 4-4-2 steam tank locomotives designed by D. E. Marsh for suburban passenger service on the London, Brighton and South Coast Railway.

History

This class was intended to haul secondary passenger trains, especially in the south London suburbs, and twenty locomotives were constructed by Brighton works between June 1906 and December 1907. The locomotives proved to be reliable but with disappointing performance in their original form, being poor steamers, but all of them passed to the Southern Railway in 1923. They reportedly gained the nickname "Wankers" due to the aforementioned steaming issues.

I1X class

Between 1925 and 1932 they were rebuilt by Richard Maunsell with spare boilers left over after the rebuilding of the B4 and I3 classes. The rebuilt engines were designated I1x class, and these new larger boilers greatly improved their performance.

Withdrawals

Two worn-out members of the class were withdrawn by the Southern Railway in 1944 and 1946 respectively, but the remainder survived into British Railways (BR) ownership in 1948, although all had been withdrawn by July 1951 and none have been preserved.

Numbering

The first ten were numbered 595-604 and the second ten were numbered 1-10.  The Southern Railway initially added a "B" prefix to these numbers and later renumbered them 2595-2604 and 2001-2010.    BR added 30000 to the numbers but it is believed that only 32005 actually carried its number.

Locomotive Summary

Notes

Sources

 Dendy Marshall, C. F., History of the Southern Railway, Ian Allan 1988, page 270,

External links
 Marsh I1/Maunsell I1x Class 4-4-2T Southern E-Group

I1
4-4-2T locomotives
Railway locomotives introduced in 1906
Scrapped locomotives
Standard gauge steam locomotives of Great Britain